Ellenbrook Christian College is a Christian non-denominational, co-educational school catering for students from pre-kindergarten to Year 12. Commencing in 2001, the College has been built in the developing subdivision of Ellenbrook on the outskirts of the Perth. The College is a member of the Swan Christian Education Association Inc.

History 
The College opened for students in 2001 with Jack Joyce as inaugural Principal and Doreen Smith as inaugural College Council Chair. In that first year, the College consisted of 13 staff and 151 students by year's end.

Campus 
The College is built on one campus located at 5 Santona Boulevard in Ellenbrook, Western Australia. The Junior School library and technology centre and the Secondary gymnasium, auditorium and performing arts buildings are the most recently constructed additions to the campus. They were completed in 2011 with financial assistance from the Australian Government's Building the Education Revolution.

Morley–Ellenbrook railway line
In 2021, the Morley–Ellenbrook railway line will begin construction. The railway line's alignment goes through Ellenbrook Christian College, between the buildings and the oval. The railway will probably be built on an embankment, with a pedestrian underpass allowing access between the buildings and oval. The land has been reserved for railway since the 1990s, with the school purchasing the land with the knowledge that the railway would eventually be built.

Curriculum 
In Years K-10, the curriculum is derived from a combination of the Western Australian and the incoming Australian Curriculum, which will eventually supersede the Curriculum Framework. In the upper school years (Year 11 & 12), students study for a Western Australian Certificate of Education as managed by the Schools Curriculum and Standards Authority.

Extra curricular activities 
 Bush Ranger Cadets (years 8 to 12)
 DEC River Rangers (year 7)
Golf Academy (years 7 to 12)

See also 
 List of schools in the Perth metropolitan area

References

External links 
Ellenbrook Christian College website
Swan Christian Education Association

Private secondary schools in Perth, Western Australia
Nondenominational Christian schools in Perth, Western Australia
Private primary schools in Perth, Western Australia
Ellenbrook, Western Australia
Educational institutions established in 2001
2001 establishments in Australia